The Logistic Regiment "Ariete" is a military logistics regiment of the Italian Army based in Maniago in Friuli Venezia Giulia. Today the regiment is the logistic unit of the 132nd Armored Brigade "Ariete".

History 
In 1963 the Italian Army reorganized its divisions and created autonomous brigades under a division's command. Consequently on 1 June 1963 the III Services Battalion "Ariete" was formed in Maniago to support the Armored Division "Ariete"'s III Brigade, which was centered around the 132nd Tank Regiment. On 1 October 1968 the brigades of the divisions were disbanded and the III Services Battalion was assigned to the division's Services Grouping "Ariete".

During the 1975 army reform the army disbanded the regimental level and newly independent battalions were granted for the first time their own flags. On 1 November 1975 the III Services Battalion was renamed Logistic Battalion "Manin" and assigned to the 132nd Armored Brigade "Manin". On 12 November 1976 the President of the Italian Republic Giovanni Leone issued decree 846, which granted the new units their flags.

Initially the battalion consisted of a command, a command platoon, a transport and supply company, a medium workshop, and a vehicles park. In 1981 the battalion as reorganized and now consisted of a command, a command and services company, a supply company, a maintenance company, a medium transport company. On 1 October 1986 the Italian Army abolished the divisional level and the Armored Division "Ariete" was disbanded and the division's name and traditions passed to 132nd Armored Brigade "Manin", which was renamed 132nd Armored Brigade "Ariete". Therefore on 10 October 1986 the Logistic Battalion "Manin" was renamed Logistic Battalion "Ariete".

On 30 June 2015 the battalion was elevated to Logistic Regiment "Ariete" without changing size or composition.

Current structure 
Like all Italian Army brigade logistic regiments the Logistic Regiment "Ariete" consists of:

  Regimental Command, in Maniago
 Logistic Battalion
 Command
 Tactical Control Squad
 Supply Company
 Transport Company
 Maintenance Company
 Command and Logistic Support Company
 C3 Platoon
 Transport and Materiel Platoon
 Deployment Support Platoon
 Commissariat Platoon
 Garrison Support Unit

The Regimental Command consists of the Commandant's and Personnel Office, the Operations, Training and Information Office, the Logistic Office, and the Administration Office.

See also 
 Military logistics

External links
Italian Army Website: Reggimento Logistico "Ariete"

References 

Logistic Regiments of Italy